Choquet is a French surname. Notable people with the surname include:

Antoine Choquet de Lindu (1712–1790), French architect and military engineer
Gustave Choquet (1915–2006), French mathematician
Daniel Choquet (born 1962), French neuroscientist
Yvonne Choquet-Bruhat (born 1923), French mathematician and physicist

See also
Choquet integral, a way of measuring the expected utility of an uncertain event
Choquet theory states that for a compact convex subset C in a normed space V, any c in C is the barycentre of a probability measure supported on the set E of extreme points of C

French-language surnames